CeeLo Green (born 1975) is an American recording artist. He has received a multitude of awards and accolades in recognition of his success in the music industry. This includes five Grammy Awards, one BET Award, one Billboard Music Award, and one Brit Award.

BET Awards

|-
| rowspan="3" | 2007 || "Crazy" || Video of the Year || 
|-
| rowspan="2" | Gnarls Barkley || Best New Artist || 
|-
| Best Group || 
|-
| 2008 || Gnarls Barkley || Best Group || 
|-
| rowspan="2" | 2011 || rowspan="2" | CeeLo Green || Best Male R&B Artist || 
|-
| Centric Award ||

Billboard Music Awards

|-
| 2006 || "Crazy" || Digital Song of the Year || 
|-
| 2011 || CeeLo Green || Viral Innovator of the Year || 
|-
| rowspan="2" | 2012 || CeeLo Green || R&B Artist of the Year || 
|-
| "Fuck You" || R&B Song of the Year ||

Brit Awards

|-
| rowspan="3" | 2007 || St. Elsewhere || International Album || 
|-
| rowspan="2" | Gnarls Barkley || International Breakthrough Act || 
|-
| International Group || 
|-
| rowspan="2" | 2011 || The Lady Killer || International Album || 
|-
| CeeLo Green || International Male Solo Artist ||

Grammy Awards

|-
| 2003 || "Gettin' Grown" || Best Urban/Alternative Performance || 
|-
| rowspan="4" | 2007 || rowspan="2" |"Crazy" || Record of the Year || 
|-
| Best Urban/Alternative Performance || 
|-
| rowspan="2" | St. Elsewhere || Album of the Year || 
|-
| Best Alternative Music Album || 
|-
| 2008 || "Gone Daddy Gone" || Best Music Video || 
|-
| rowspan="3" | 2009 || "Going On" || Best Pop Performance by a Duo or Group with Vocals || 
|-
| "Who's Gonna Save My Soul" || Best Music Video || 
|-
| The Odd Couple || Best Alternative Music Album || 
|-
| rowspan="4" | 2011 || rowspan="4" | "Fuck You" || Record of the Year || 
|-
| Song of the Year || 
|-
| Best Urban/Alternative Performance || 
|-
| Best Music Video || 
|-
| rowspan="4" | 2012 || rowspan="2" | "Fool for You"  || Best Traditional R&B Performance || 
|-
| Best R&B Song || 
|-
| The Lady Killer || Best Pop Vocal Album || 
|-
| Doo-Wops & Hooligans  || Album of the Year || 
|-
| 2014 || Cee Lo's Magic Moment || Best Traditional Pop Vocal Album ||

MOBO Awards

|-
| 2015 || CeeLo Green || Outstanding Achievement Award ||

MTV Europe Music Awards

|-
| rowspan="3" | 2006 || Gnarls Barkley || Best New Act || 
|-
| rowspan="2" | "Crazy" || Best Song || 
|-
| Best Video ||

MTV Video Music Awards

|-
| rowspan="3" | 2006 || rowspan="3" | "Crazy" || Best Group Video || 
|-
| Best Direction || 
|-
| Best Editing || 
|-
| 2007 || "Smiley Face" || Best Editing || 
|-
| rowspan="2" | 2008 || rowspan="2" | "Run (I'm a Natural Disaster)" || Best Choreography || 
|-
| Best Art Direction || 
|-
| rowspan="3" | 2009 || rowspan="3" | "Who's Gonna Save My Soul" || Breakthrough Video || 
|-
| Best Visual Effects || 
|-
| Best Art Direction || 
|-
| 2011 || "F ck You" || Best Male Video ||

MTVU Woodie Awards

|-
| rowspan="2" | 2006 || Gnarls Barkley || Left Field Woodie || 
|-
| "Crazy" || Best Video Woodie – Animated || 
|-
| 2008 || "Who's Gonna Save My Soul" || Best Video Woodie ||

NAACP Image Awards

|-
| rowspan="2" | 2007 || Gnarls Barkley || Outstanding Duo or Group || 
|-
| "Crazy" || Outstanding Song || 
|-
| rowspan="2" | 2011 || CeeLo Green || Outstanding Male Artist || 
|-
| "Fuck You" || Outstanding Song || 
|-
| rowspan="3" | 2012 || CeeLo Green || Outstanding Male Artist || 
|-
| CeeLo Green & Melanie Fiona || Outstanding Duo or Group || 
|-
| "Fool for You"  || Outstanding Song || 
|-
| 2013 || "This Christmas" || Outstanding Music Video ||

NME Awards

|-
| 2011 || "Fuck You" || Best Track ||

Q Awards

|-
| rowspan="2" | 2006 || "Crazy" || Best Track || 
|-
| "Smiley Face" || Best Video || 
|-
| 2011 || CeeLo Green || Best Male Artist ||

Slammy Awards

|-
| 2011 || CeeLo Green & Beyonce || WWE A-lister of the Year ||

Soul Train Music Awards

|-
| rowspan="2" | 2007 || St. Elsewhere || Best R&B/Soul Album – Group, Band or Duo || 
|-
| "Crazy" || Best R&B/Soul Single – Group, Band or Duo || 
|-
| 2011 || CeeLo Green || Best R&B/Soul Male Artist ||

Teen Choice Awards

|-
| rowspan="2" | 2006 || Gnarls Barkley || Choice Music: Male Breakout Artist || 
|-
| "Crazy" || Choice Music: Summer Song || 
|-
| rowspan="2" | 2011 || CeeLo Green || Choice Music: Male Artist || 
|-
| "Fuck You" || Choice Music: Break-Up Song || 
|-
| rowspan="2" | 2012 || rowspan="2" | CeeLo Green || Choice TV: Male Personality || 
|-
| Choice Fashion Icon: Male ||

References
CeeLo Green albums